The Kerimäki Church in Kerimäki, Finland, is the largest wooden church in the world. However, St. George's Cathedral, Georgetown located in Guyana is taller, at 43.5 metres (143 ft). The Almaty Cathedral, at 56 meters, is even taller.

History
Altogether, there can be 5,000 people at a time in the church.

It has been rumoured that the size of the church was the result of a miscalculation when it was built (supposedly the architect was working in centimetres, which the builder misunderstood to be inches, which are 2.54 times larger). Further studies, however, have shown that the church was actually intended to be as big as it is, so it could easily accommodate a half of the area's population at the same time.

During wintertime, services are held in a smaller "winter church" (built in 1953, re-modelled in 1997 ), since the main building has no heating.

References

External links

Information on the church

Wooden churches in Finland
Buildings and structures in South Savo
Churches completed in 1847
1847 establishments in the Russian Empire
Lutheran churches in Finland